Kentrochrysalis streckeri is a species of moth of the family Sphingidae.

Distribution 
It is known from Mongolia, the Russian Far East, north-eastern China and North Korea.

Description 
The wingspan is 88–90 mm. In Khabarovsk in Russia there is one full generation with adults on wing from May to July, with a partial second generation in August in some years.

Biology 
The larvae have been recorded feeding on Fraxinus (including Fraxinus mandshurica), Ligustrum and Syringa species in Primorskiy Kray.

References

Sphingulini
Moths described in 1880